Batophila aerata is a species of Chrysomelidae family, that is common in South England, France, Corsica, Germany, Italy, Slovenia, Greece, Spain, Algeria, Morocco, Tunisia. That can be found in islands such as Sardinia and Sicily.

References

Beetles described in 1802
Alticini
Beetles of Europe
Taxa named by Thomas Marsham